Silikyan, formerly Spandaryan, is a neighbourhood of the Ajapnyak District of the Armenian capital Yerevan 

With a population of more than 10,000, the neighbourhood is located at the northwest of the city.

References

Populated places in Yerevan